S. B. Brodbeck Housing, also known as The Brick House, is a set of four historic rowhouses located  at Codorus Township, Pennsylvania, York County, Pennsylvania. It was built in 1890–1891, and is a three-story, plus attic, brick building. It has a mansard roof with a fish-scale slate pattern in the Second Empire-style.  The row measures 73 feet wide and 29 feet deep.  It features a full-length two-story front porch and balcony, with an intricate railing and post bracket pattern.  It was built by locally prominent Samuel B. Brodbeck.

It was added to the National Register of Historic Places in 1990.

References

Houses on the National Register of Historic Places in Pennsylvania
Second Empire architecture in Pennsylvania
Houses completed in 1891
Houses in York County, Pennsylvania
National Register of Historic Places in York County, Pennsylvania